Events in the year 2022 in the United Arab Emirates.

Incumbents

Events 
Ongoing: COVID-19 pandemic in the United Arab Emirates

January 

 1 January - The United Arab Emirates announces that unvaccinated citizens will be banned from travel and that vaccinated citizens will need to receive a booster dose of the COVID-19 vaccine beginning on January 10.
 3 January - Houthi forces capture a United Arab Emirates-flagged cargo ship, the Rwabee, off Al Hudaydah, Yemen. The UAE government says that the vessel was carrying equipment from a closed coalition field hospital on Socotra while the Houthis say that the vessel was carrying military equipment.
 17 January - 2022 Abu Dhabi attack: Three people are killed in a drone attack on petrol tanks at a major oil storage facility near Abu Dhabi International Airport. The Yemen-based Houthis claim responsibility, saying that they launched "five ballistic missiles and a large number of drones".
 24 January - The United Arab Emirates Armed Forces intercepts two ballistic missiles over the Emirati capital Abu Dhabi. The Yemen-based Houthis claim responsibility for the attack. American troops stationed at Al Dhafra Air Base near the capital take shelter in bunkers during the attack.

February 

 12 February - 2021 FIFA Club World Cup: In association football, English club Chelsea win their first FIFA Club World Cup title after beating Brazilian club Palmeiras 2–1 after extra time in the final at the Mohammed bin Zayed Stadium in Abu Dhabi. Chelsea defender Thiago Silva wins the tournament's Golden Ball award.
 18 February - India and the United Arab Emirates sign a free trade agreement over digital goods, raw materials, and apparels. It is the first major trade deal signed by India since Prime Minister Narendra Modi came into power in 2014.
 26 February - The United Arab Emirates removes the mandatory face masks mandate in outdoor spaces, making the use of them optional.

March 

 28 March - The foreign ministers of Israel, Egypt, Morocco, Bahrain and the United Arab Emirates, as well as the United States Secretary of State, meet in Sde Boker, Israel, and agree to hold regular meetings about regional security and commit to further expanding economic and diplomatic cooperation.
 31 March - The world expo in Dubai, which was delayed to October 1, 2021, closes after six months.

May 

 13 May - President of the United Arab Emirates and ruler of Abu Dhabi Khalifa bin Zayed Al Nahyan dies at the age of 73.
 14 May - The Federal Supreme Council of the United Arab Emirates appoints Mohamed bin Zayed Al Nahyan as the country's new president, who also inherits the Emirate of Abu Dhabi after the death of his half-brother Khalifa bin Zayed Al Nahyan.
 23 May - Two people are killed and 120 others are injured when a gas cylinder catches fire and explodes at a restaurant in Abu Dhabi.
 24 May - The United Arab Emirates confirms its first case of monkeypox.

June 

 6 June - The South African Justice Department confirms that Rajesh Gupta and Atul Gupta of the influential Gupta family have been arrested in the United Arab Emirates for engaging in corrupt practices during the Zuma presidency.

July 

 29 July - The UAE records its heaviest rainfall in 27 years, with seven people killed by flooding in the Emirates of Sharjah and Fujairah.

August 

 21 August - The United Arab Emirates announces the reinstallation of its ambassador to Iran, which will take effect "in the coming days", more than six years after it cut off diplomatic relations with the Islamic republic.

Deaths 
31 March – Easa Saleh Al Gurg, businessman and diplomat.

13 May – Khalifa bin Zayed Al Nahyan, president (born 1948)

References 

 
Years of the 21st century in the United Arab Emirates
United Arab Emirates
United Arab Emirates
2020s in the United Arab Emirates